Le Gosier is a commune in the French overseas region and department of Guadeloupe, in the Lesser Antilles. It is located on the south side of the island of Grande-Terre and part of the urban unit of Pointe-à-Pitre-Les Abymes, the largest conurbation in Guadeloupe.

Population

Education
Public preschools include:
 Ecole maternelle Marcel Armantine
 Ecole maternelle Maryse Pierre Justin Borel
 Ecole maternelle Alexis Eugène
 Ecole maternelle Grand Bois
 Ecole maternelle Armand Lazard

Public primary schools include:
 Ecole primaire Lazare Armand
 Ecole primaire Gillot Augustin
 Ecole primaire Marcel Georges
 Ecole primaire Lantin Germaine
 Ecole primaire Pater Hildevert
 Ecole primaire Moinet Klébert
 Ecole primaire Pliane
 Ecole primaire Jasor Saturnin
 Ecole primaire Rollon Suzanne
 Ecole primaire Thénard Turenne

Public junior high schools include:
 Collège Edmond Bambuck

Public senior high schools include:
 LDM de l'Hôtellerie et de Tourisme Archipel Guadeloupe

Notable people
 

Léopold Hélène (1926–2012), politician

See also
Communes of the Guadeloupe department

References

External links

Communes of Guadeloupe